Miguel Ángel Reyes-Varela and Max Schnur were the defending champions but chose not to defend their title.

Tomasz Bednarek and David Pel won the title after defeating Filippo Baldi and Omar Giacalone 6–1, 6–1 in the final.

Seeds

Draw

References
 Main Draw

Aspria Tennis Cup - Doubles
2017 Doubles